François Vérove (22 January 1962 – 29 September 2021), also known as Le Grêlé (the "Pockmarked Man"), was a French serial killer, rapist and police officer who murdered at least three people between 1986 and 1994 in the Île-de-France region. He received his nickname from acne scars seen on his face by witnesses following his first murder. Vérove committed suicide in September 2021 upon realizing that he was about to be identified.

Vérove's first murder, that of 11-year-old Cécile Bloch, took place in the 19th arrondissement of Paris in 1986. The following year he murdered two adults in the 4th arrondissement. He was linked to two further murders in 1991 and 1994, as well as two rapes in 1987 and 1994. During his crime spree, Vérove belonged to various French police forces; he was a member of the National Gendarmerie between 1983 and 1988, serving as a motorcyclist in the Republican Guard, then became an officer in the National Police in Paris until his retirement in 2019. He briefly held elected office as a municipal councillor in Prades-le-Lez, Hérault, between 2019 and 2020.

On 24 September 2021, Vérove received a police summons to provide a DNA sample as part of an investigation into the Bloch killing. His wife reported him missing on 27 September. Two days later, Vérove killed himself by barbiturate overdose in a rented flat in Le Grau-du-Roi, Gard. He left behind a suicide note in which he confessed to his crimes.

Early life
François Vérove was born on 22 January 1962 in Gravelines, Nord, France, and grew up in nearby Marcq-en-Barœul. An only child, Vérove was raised by his strict father, his stepmother and two half-sisters; his birth mother had died of influenza two weeks before the family moved from Gravelines. As a youth, Vérove was said to be a fan of horror films such as Cannibal Holocaust. Vérove was married in June 1985.

Education and career
In 1983, Vérove moved to Paris and joined the National Gendarmerie, serving in the motorcycle squadron of the Republican Guard. By 1988 he had switched to the National Police and its jurisdictions in the Paris Police Prefecture, performing his duties in the department of Hauts-de-Seine in the Île-de-France region. Throughout his police career, Vérove participated in trade union activities and served as a delegate. He was described by a former friend as kind and "a gentleman to everyone" yet could nevertheless could "get angry easily".

During his police career, Vérove lived in Longperrier, Seine-et-Marne, in a house he himself constructed for his family. He then moved to the south of France, first settling in Port-Saint-Louis-du-Rhône and then in Martigues, both in Bouches-du-Rhône. Following his retirement, Vérove moved to Prades-le-Lez, Hérault, where he was elected as a municipal councillor in 2019. The following year, he moved elsewhere in Hérault to La Grande-Motte, where he resided until close to the time of his death in September 2021.

Confirmed crimes

13th arrondissement victim (1986)
On 7 April 1986, in the 13th arrondissement of Paris, Vérove encountered an eight-year-old girl in an elevator as she was traveling to school. He forcibly dragged the girl to a basement of her apartment building, raped her and attempted to strangle her with a cord. Presumably believing he had killed her, Vérove fled the scene. However, the victim survived the assault and alerted authorities.

Cécile Bloch (1986)

Less than a month later, on 5 May 1986, eleven-year-old Cécile Bloch was also traveling to school when she encountered Vèrove in the elevator of her apartment building, located at 116 Rue Petit in the 19th arrondissement of Paris. Vérove forcibly took her to a room in the basement of the building, raped her and proceeded to stab and strangle her. The assault was so violent that Bloch's spine was broken. Bloch's body was discovered later that day wrapped in a carpet. Witnesses who observed Vérove at the apartment building, who included Bloch's parents and half-brother, recalled his face being covered in acne scars; this description was included in facial composites of the suspect and led to the French press dubbing him Le Grêlé (the "Pockmarked Man").

Politi-Müller case (1987)

Vérove struck again eleven months later, on 28 April 1987, this time targeting two adults. His victims were Gilles Politi, a 38-year-old aerial technician, and Irmgard Müller, a German au pair employed by Politi's family, in an apartment in the Marais district of Paris. Their bodies were discovered together in the apartment: Politi had been stripped naked and forced to lie face down, with his arms and legs bound in a "choke lace"; while Müller had been hung by her arms from the upright frame of a bunk bed, her throat slashed with a knife. Both victims had suffered physical torture via cigarette burns prior to death.

Police believed that the killer had been in a personal relationship with Müller. Her contact book included a name, "Élie Lauringe", which did not exist in France's civil registry, leading investigators to believe that the name had been a pseudonym. Witnesses reported seeing an athletic man in his twenties enter Müller's apartment on the Rue de Sévigné on 27 April; he was seen again communicating with Müller through her intercom the following morning, shortly before the killing took place.

14th arrondissement victim (1987)
On 27 October 1987, a fourteen-year-old girl returning home from school was stopped by Vérove, who identified himself as a police officer and claimed he needed to question her for an investigation. Vérove soon dragged his victim into an apartment before handcuffing and raping her. He left the victim alive after burglarizing the apartment.

"Ingrid G." (1994)
After a seven-year lull in activity, Le Grêlé resurfaced in Mitry-Mory, Seine-et-Marne, on 29 June 1994. An eleven-year-old girl, identified in reports as "Ingrid G.", was cycling along a high-speed railway line when she was approached by Vérove, who demanded that she enter his car on the pretense of being taken to the police station. Upon being abducted, Ingrid was driven more than an hour away to an abandoned farm at Saclay, Essonne, where she was raped for several hours. Vérove fled the scene without killing Ingrid.

Investigation
Police investigating the crimes of Le Grêlé realized that their suspect was one of their own. Surviving witnesses recalled the suspect brandishing an official business card from the police or the gendarme; utilised police equipment such as handcuffs and walkie-talkies; spoke recognizable police jargon; and possessed an extensive knowledge of investigative procedure which he used to escape detection. In the Politi-Müller case, the suspect had given a false address for "Élie Lauringe" which was traced back to a former office in the 13th arrondissement. The final confirmed Le Grêlé attack took place in Saclay, where a gendarmerie training center was located.

Müller's autopsy determined that, before her death, she had had consensual sex with an unidentified man whose semen was recovered from a tampon. It was not until 2001 that a DNA sample taken from the tampon linked the Politi-Müller case to the murder of Cécile Bloch. Fingerprints were also recovered from cigarette butts found at the Politi-Müller murder scene. Investigators collected DNA evidence from non-fatal attack in the 14th arrondissement, but that attack wouldn't be conclusively linked to Vérove's other crimes until nine years later. Further forensic evidence was collected in the "Ingrid G." attack, which was soon to the earlier cases.

Death
In 2021, Nathalie Turquey, an investigating judge who had taken over the Le Grêlé case in 2014, requested the summons of 750 gendarmes who had been active in the Île-de-France region at the time of the original crime spree, in which each man was asked to submit a DNA sample. On 24 September 2021, Vérove received his summons via telephone and quickly fled his home in La Grande-Motte; his wife reported him missing on 27 September. Vérove rented an apartment in the coastal commune of Le-Grau-du-Roi, where he committed suicide by via overdosing on alcohol and barbiturates on 29 September 2021.

Vérove left behind a suicide note, addressed to his wife, in which he admitted to being "a great criminal who committed unforgivable acts until the end of the 1990s" and claimed to have acted under the influence of "impulses"; he also claimed to have suppressed these impulses when he started his family. Vérove's note also claimed that he had "done nothing since 1997", implying he committed other crimes that the authorities weren't yet aware of. 

Two days after Vérove's death, the prosecutor's office in Paris announced that a "DNA comparison [has] established today a match between the dna profile found at several crime scenes and that of the deceased man."

Other alleged victims 
After his identification, in September 2021, François Vérove is suspected of being the author of other attacks and crimes. Specializing in the oldest "cold-cases", criminologist Corinne Herrmann hypothesizes that the "Grêlé" could potentially be involved in the murders of:

 Sophie Narne (23), was murdered in an apartment she was showing in the 19th arrondissement of Paris on 5 December 1991. 

 Karine Leroy (19), disappeared in Meaux on 9 June 1994; her body was found in a nearby forest a month later.

In March 2022, two books, devoted to the crimes of François Vérove, were published in order to consider the possibility that Vérove could have caused more victims. Brendan Kemmet and Stéphane Sellami, two investigative journalists, released La Traque du Grêlé. The journalist Patricia Tourancheau, who also looks into the case of François Vérove, also publishes a book entitled Le Grêlé. The killer was a cop. It is in this context that the investigators on the "Grêlé" affair are working on 31 victims attributable to Vérove, including 9 murders.

References

See also
 

1962 births
2021 deaths
2021 suicides
20th-century French criminals
Child sexual abuse in France
Drug-related suicides in France
French male criminals
French murderers of children
French police officers
French rapists
French serial killers
Fugitives
Male serial killers
People from Nord (French department)
Serial killers who worked in law enforcement